KSS-3 may stand for:
 Korean Attack Submarine program, third phase of a project to build up the ROK Navy's submarine forces.
 Dosan Ahn Changho-class submarine, submarine design chosen under the third phase (KSS-3) of the Korean Attack Submarine program.